Joe Marchal (born October 9, 1960) is a former US National Champion and a US Olympian in Judo. Marchal competed in the 1988 Summer Olympics. Marchal is currently a professional poker player. Joe is a native of Wisconsin. Marchal owns a house in Guam.

References

1960 births
Living people
American male judoka
Judoka at the 1988 Summer Olympics
American poker players
Universiade medalists in judo
Olympic judoka of the United States
Universiade silver medalists for the United States
Medalists at the 1985 Summer Universiade
20th-century American people
21st-century American people